The FINA World Masters Championships (or "Masters Worlds") is an international Aquatics championships for adults (per FINA rules, Masters are 25 years old and older). The championships is held biennially, with competition in all five of FINA's disciplines: Swimming, Diving, Water polo, Open water swimming, and Synchronized swimming.  Starting in 2015, the competition was held jointly with the FINA World Aquatics Championships.

Editions

Results

2019

Swimming
Source:

See also
Masters swimming
European Masters Swimming Championships

References

External links
Website for the results of the FINA World Masters Championships are reported in the FINA dedicated web page (PDF)
FINA XIV World Masters Champs 2012 in Riccione (ITA) (PDF)

Masters swimming
Recurring sporting events established in 1986
World championships in aquatics